Mary, Mungo and Midge is a British animated children's television series, created by John Ryan and produced by the BBC in 1969.

The show featured the adventures of a girl called Mary, her dog Mungo, and her pet mouse Midge, who lived with Mary's parents in a tower block in a busy town. BBC newsreader Richard Baker narrated the episodes, with John Ryan's daughter Isabel playing Mary. The theme tune and other music for the series were provided by Johnny Pearson, drawn from the KPM Music Library, specifically the LP 'Children and Animation' (KPM1045, 1969)

This show was one of the first children's shows in the UK to reflect urban living. The programme showed Mary having adventures in a busy town, as opposed to in a wood, forest or other rural setting, apart from in the 'Garage' episode, in which the family had a picnic in the countryside. The two featured animals were likely to be familiar to town dwellers, as opposed to the array of talking wildlife usually seen in children's television.

In each episode, the three of them would descend in the lift from their flat in the tower block. After their adventures they would return home, Midge would press the button for the lift back to the correct floor, by standing on Mungo's nose.

Mary, Mungo and Midge was a production of John Ryan Studios, who also produced the earlier Captain Pugwash and the later The Adventures of Sir Prancelot series, both with a similar drawing style.

However, despite never being renewed for a second series - with the Watch with Mother title being dropped in 1975 - it continued to air as re-runs on BBC1 up until 1978, with the last annual book (for 1975) being released in 1974. The Complete Mary, Mungo and Midge was released on DVD on 5 April 2004.

Episodes

References 

BBC children's television shows
British children's animated adventure television series
1960s British children's television series
1969 British television series debuts
1969 British television series endings
English-language television shows
1960s British animated television series
Animated television series about children
Animated television series about dogs
Animated television series about mice and rats
Television series by BBC Studios